Metra is the commuter rail system serving the Chicago metropolitan area in the U.S. states of Illinois and Wisconsin, servicing Cook, DuPage, Kane, Lake, McHenry, and Will Counties in northeastern Illinois and the city of Kenosha in southeastern Wisconsin. It is one of three of the Regional Transportation Authority's service boards. With an average weekday ridership of 294,600 in 2015, Metra is the fourth-busiest commuter rail system in the United States, only behind New York City metropolitan area systems. The newest Metra station in Joliet, Illinois opened on April 11, 2018.

In 1974, the Regional Transit Authority (RTA) was created to provide stability in the commuter rail system, as most private commuter companies in the area were beginning to fail. In 1984, RTA created the Commuter Rail Service Board to help with planning an organized commuter rail system in the Chicago area. The board was renamed Metra in 1985. Through the creation of the Northeast Illinois Regional Commuter Railroad Corporation (NIRC), Metra's operating subsidiary and contracts with freight companies, Metra was able to open a network of commuter rail lines across the region. The system's newest line, the North Central Service, opened on August 19, 1996.

Seven of the system's eleven lines are owned or operated by the NIRC. Operation of the BNSF Line and the Union Pacific North Line, Union Pacific Northwest Line, and the Union Pacific West Line are handled through purchase of service agreements (PSAs) between Metra, the BNSF Railway and the Union Pacific Railroad. Under these agreements, the railroad companies provide the service using their own employees and either own or control the rights-of-way in addition to the majority of other facilities necessary, while Metra provides the rolling stock. Additionally, Metra funds the portion of South Shore Line within Illinois because it shares tracks with the Metra Electric District. Metra also operates the  station, although no Metra trains serve the station.

The development of Chicago's commuter rail network resulted in a spoke–hub distribution paradigm and Metra's services radiate out from the Chicago Loop from four terminals: Ogilvie Transportation Center, Union Station, LaSalle Street Station, and Millennium Station. However, all are within a  radius of each other and easily accessible from one another, either by walking, cycling, driving, or the use of public transport.

Key

Lines

Stations

Route diagram

Future stations

Former stations

References

Metra
Metra